Baran Kosari (born 16 September 1985) is an Iranian actress.

Biography
She graduated from Soureh academy. The Best Papa of the World (1991) is her first acting experience. She had appearances in some of her mother's films, Nargess (1991), Rusari-ye Abi (The Blue-Veiled) (1994), May Lady (1997), Kish Stories (Rain and Ladsman episode - 1998), Under the Skin of the City (2000), Our Times (documentary - 2001). In 2007 she was nominated for the best performance by an actress in Asia Pacific Screen Award for her performance in Mainline.

Baran Kosari also ascertained her abilities as a theater actress with playing in Over the Mirror (1997), with Azita Hajian directing.

Filmography

Cinema

Television series

Theater

Awards
 Won Crystal Simorgh / Best Actress / 33rd Fajr International Film Festival / The Nameless Alley - 2015
 Nominated Crystal Simorgh / Best Actress / 30rd Fajr International Film Festival / Hatred - 2012
 Best Actress / 1st National Young Iranian Film Festival / Ablah - 2010
 Best Actress / 11th Iran Cinema Celebration / Mainline - 2007
 Nominated Crystal Simorgh /  Best Actress / 27th Fajr International Film Festival / Heyran - 2009
 Won Crystal Simorgh / Best Actress / 25th Fajr International Film Festival / Mainline and The Third Day - 2007
 Best Actress / 11th House of Cinema / Mainline - 2008
 Honorary Diploma / Best Actress / 25th International Fajr Film Festival / Mainline - 2007
 Nominated Asia Pacific Screen Awards / Best Actress / Mainline - 2007
 Best Teenage Actress / Critic Choose / Baran-o-Bumi and Under the Skin of the City - 2000

Other activities
 Screenwriter (Ablah - 2007)
 Secretary of Scene (Gilaneh - 2004)
 Festival Arbiter, 17th Teenage Film Festival (Isfahan - 2002)

See also
 List of Iranian actresses

References

External links

 
 سانسور جدید باران کوثری در تلویزیون

Iranian film actresses
Iranian child actresses
People from Tehran
1985 births
Living people
Crystal Simorgh for Best Actress winners